|}

The Silken Glider Stakes is a Group 3 flat horse race in Ireland open to two-year-old thoroughbred fillies. It is run at the Curragh over a distance of 1 mile (1,609 metres), and it is scheduled to take place each year in September.

The race was first run in 2001.  It was run at Leopardstown until 2002. Since 2007 it has been sponsored and run as the Staffordstown Stud Stakes.

The Silken Glider Stakes is promoted to Group 3 in 2022.

Records
Leading jockey (3 wins):
 Seamie Heffernan – 	Miss Helga (2002), Savethisdanceforme (2007), Fancy Blue (2019) 
 Johnny Murtagh– Jioconda (2005), Lady Lupus (2009), Gemstone (2010) 

Leading trainer (10 wins):
 Aidan O'Brien – Miss Helga (2002), Savethisdanceforme (2007), Lady Lupus (2009), Gemstone (2010), Homecoming Queen (2011), Together Forever (2014), Best In The World (2015), Bye Bye Baby (2017), Peach Tree (2018), Fancy Blue (2019)

Winners

See also
 Horse racing in Ireland
 List of Irish flat horse races

References

Racing Post:

Flat races in Ireland
Curragh Racecourse
Flat horse races for two-year-old fillies
Recurring sporting events established in 2001
2001 establishments in Ireland